Jeunesse Sportive Madinet de Béjaïa, known as JSM Béjaïa or simply JSMB for short, is an Algerian football club based in Béjaïa. The club was founded in 1936 and its colours are green and red. Their home stadium, Maghrebi Unity Stadium, has a capacity of 18,000 spectators. The club is currently playing in the Inter-Régions Division.

Achievements

National titles 
 Algerian Ligue 1
 Runners-up : 2011 and 2012.
 Algerian Cup
 Winners : 2008.

International titles 
 North African Cup Winners Cup
 Finalist : 2009.
 CAF Champions League
 Play-off Round : 2013.
 CAF Confederation Cup
 Play-off Round : 2013.

Managers after 2003 
  Jules Accorsi (July 1, 2003 – Déc, 2003)
  Nour Benzekri (Déc, 2003 – June, 2004)
  Abdelhamid Talah (2005–06)
  Eurico Gomes (2006–07)
  Rachid Cherradi (2007)
  El Hadi Khezzar (2007–08)
  Jean-Yves Chay (Aug, 2008 – Jan, 2009)
  Djamel Menad (2009–11)
  Fouad Bouali (July 1, 2011 – Jan 2, 2012)
  Alain Michel (Jan 4, 2012 – Jan 21, 2013)
  Giovanni Solinas (Jan 23, 2013 – June 30, 2013)
  Noureddine Saâdi (July 3, 2013 – Oct 6, 2013)
  Kamel Djabour (Oct 7, 2013– Mar 2014)
  Hassan Hammouche (Mar, 2014 – Aug, 2014)
  Ali Fergani (Aug, 2014 – Jan, 2015)
  Mustapha Heddane (Jan, 2015 – Jan, 2015)
  Hassan Hammouche (Jan, 2015 – Feb, 2015)
  Stéphane Paille (Feb, 2015 – Apr, 2015)
  Amine Ghimouz (Apr, 2015 –Oct, 2015)
  Said Hammouche (Oct, 2015 – Feb, 2016)
  Ali Fergani (Feb, 2016 – Mar, 2016)
  Lamine Kebbir (Mar, 2016 – May, 2016)
  El Hadi Khezzar (July, 2016 – Dec, 2016)
  Toufik Kabri (Dec, 2016 – Dec, 2016)
  Younes Ifticen (Dec, 2016 – Jun, 2017)
  Mounir Zeghdoud (Jun, 2017 - Jun, 2018)
  Mustapha Biskri (Jun, 2018- Sep, 2018)
  Samy Boucekine (Sep, 2018- Nov, 2018)
  Moez Bouakaz (Nov, 2018- Jun, 2019)
  Mohamed Lacete (Jun, 2019- Sep, 2019)
  Moez Bouakaz (Sep, 2019- Jan, 2020)
  Said Hammouche (Jan, 2020- )

Rival clubs
  MO Béjaïa (Derby)
  JS Kabylie (Derby)
  WA Tlemcen (Rivalry)

References

External links 
  Official Site
 
 

 
Association football clubs established in 1936
Béjaïa Province
Algerian Ligue 2 clubs
1936 establishments in Algeria
Sports clubs in Algeria